Big Fork Mountain is a mountain located in the Catskill Mountains of New York southwest of Gregorytown. Stearns Hill is the variant name. Elm Tree Ridge is located west-northwest, Jehu Mountain is located west-northwest, and Cherry Ridge is located south of Big Fork Mountain.

References

Mountains of Delaware County, New York
Mountains of New York (state)